Udayana University (abbreviated as UNUD) is a for-profit public university in Denpasar, Bali, Indonesia. It was established on September 29, 1962 and it used to belong to the Airlangga University that mainly located in Surabaya. Its current rector is I Nyoman Gde Antara. The university's name was derived from the 10th century Balinese King Udayana (Dharmodayana) of the Warmadewa Dynasty.

Based on official data released by the Ministry of Research, Technology and Higher Education of Indonesia (Kemenristekdikti), Udayana University is ranked 57th. The ranking released by Kemenristekdikti is based on four indicators, those are: the quality of human resources, quality of management, the variety of student activities, quality of research and publications. Moreover, based on international university ranking data released by UniRank through its website, Udayana University is ranked 2128th in the world, and 36th in Indonesia.

Udayana University obtained accreditation "A" status (the highest), where there are three levels of status, namely A, B and C, that awarded by the National Accreditation Board of Higher Education (Indonesian:  abbreviated as BAN-PT). However, in October 2022, the university was caught in a corruption scandal.

History
Udayana University was established by the Act of Minister of Higher Education Republic of Indonesia No.104/1962, on 9 August 1962, after an initial period as part of Airlangga University since 29 September 1958. It was the first university to be established in Bali Province. With four courses in 1962. In 1975, several faculties such as faculty of law, faculty of engineering, faculty of agriculture and faculty of economy was established. As of 2017, Udayana University have 13 faculties with faculty of marine and fisheries is the newest faculty was established in 2011.

Faculties
The program offered in Udayana University relatively comprehensive in the science major programs. The programs offered in the Udayana University is one of the most comprehensive programs in Indonesia.

The university has 13 faculties:

Campuses

Nias Campus
Nias Street in Denpasar was the original campus of Udayana University which was established in 1958. On this campus, situated the fabulous Statue of Saraswati, the Goddess of Knowledge, a monument for love of science and technology. It is now home for the Faculty of Letters and postgraduate programs (Masters and Doctorate) of Cultural Studies.

Sudirman Campus
Sudirman campus is in the heart of Denpasar, in easy distance of major sights. It is home to postgraduate programs and Medical Sciences faculty. The early days of the campus saw a field of palm trees planted along the front corridor, making the campus known as “Campus of Palm” (Indonesian: Kampus Palma).

The campus has grown in number and facilities. It includes the Global Development Learning Network (GDLN) Building, an information and communication technology building that facilitates students for working and strengthens connections. It also allows all university students to access distance tutorials and conferences.

Bukit Jimbaran Campus
Built in 1986, this is relatively a new campus and is the largest of Udayana's three campuses. It is designed like a town. Facilities include health clinic, university library, sport center, post office, guesthouse and university housing. An international hospital, shopping center, lake and leisure facilities are being made available soon.

The campus is not far from Pecatu, in easy reach of Ngurah Rai International Airport and the major tourism sites of Kuta and Nusa Dua.

Notable alumni
 Ayu Diandra Sari Tjakra; Puteri Bali 2008, Puteri Indonesia Lingkungan 2008 and Miss International Indonesia 2009 who won Miss Popularity at the respective Miss International 2009 beauty pageant.
 Cok Istri Krisnanda Widani;  Puteri Bali 2013, Puteri Indonesia Pariwisata 2013 and Miss Supranational Indonesia 2013 who won 3rd Runner-up at the respective Miss Supranational 2013 beauty pageant.
 Dewa Ayu Carma Citrawati; Indonesian short story writer, Balinese literature activist and Wikimedian.
 Dionísio Babo Soares; Minister of Foreign Affairs and Cooperation of East Timor. 
 I Dewa Gede Palguna; Justice, Constitutional Court of Indonesia.
 I Gede Ngurah Swajaya; Indonesian Ambassador to the Republic of Singapore.
 Odete Maria Freitas Belo; Minister of Health of East Timor.
 Ida Ayu Oka Rusmini; Indonesian poet and novelist. She is a recipient of the S.E.A. Write Award.
 Putu Ayu Saraswati; Puteri Bali 2020, Puteri Indonesia Lingkungan 2020 and Miss International Indonesia 2020. 
 Luh Ketut Suryani; Indonesian Psychiatrist.
 Rui Maria de Araújo; Prime Minister of East Timor.

References

External links
 Official site

Udayana University
Educational institutions established in 1962
Udayana University alumni
1962 establishments in Indonesia
Indonesian state universities